Taylor Cloy Morris (born June 4, 1991) is an American luger. He competed in the singles event at the 2018 Winter Olympics and placed 18th.

Morris is colorblind. He took up luge aged 10 and won the national junior championships twice. In 2014 he was a substitute in the U.S. Olympic team. 

Morris is married to Megan. In July 2011 he joined the U.S. Army, and by 2017 held a rank of sergeant.

References

External links
 

1991 births
Living people
American male lugers
Olympic lugers of the United States
Lugers at the 2018 Winter Olympics
Sportspeople from Salt Lake City
U.S. Army World Class Athlete Program